Luxembourg is a canton in the south of the Grand Duchy of Luxembourg. Its name, like the name of the Grand Duchy itself, derives from the name of its principal city, Luxembourg (more commonly known as Luxembourg City). It is not to be confused with the former district of Luxembourg, one of three administrative units in Luxembourg abolished in October 2015.

It is the only canton, other than Mersch, to be entirely surrounded by other cantons and therefore to have no international boundary. Its capital is Luxembourg.

Administrative divisions
Luxembourg Canton consists of the following eleven communes:

 Bertrange
 Contern
 Hesperange
 Luxembourg
 Niederanven
 Sandweiler
 Schuttrange
 Steinsel
 Strassen
 Walferdange
 Weiler-la-Tour

Mergers
 On 26 March 1920 the former communes of Hamm, Hollerich and Rollingergrund (all from Luxembourg Canton) were merged into the commune of Luxembourg.
 On 1 July 1920 the former commune of Eich (from Luxembourg Canton) was merged into the commune of Luxembourg.

Population

References

 
Cantons of Luxembourg